Ambroz Kapaklija (born 30 November 1996) is an Albanian football player who most recently played as a midfielder for Vllaznia Shkodër B in the Albanian First Division.

References

1996 births
Living people
Footballers from Shkodër
Albanian footballers
Association football midfielders
KF Tërbuni Pukë players
KF Vllaznia Shkodër players
Kategoria Superiore players
Kategoria e Parë players